Derek Coleman (born January 7, 1986), better known by his stage name Baby DC, is a former American child rapper from Oakland, California. He was signed to Too Short's record label Short Records, and Jive Records.

Career 
Coleman, who first started rapping at the age of five years, made his first official appearance on Too Short's 1995 album, Cocktails on the track "Thangs Change" with fellow kid rappers, Illegal. That same year he recorded his first solo track "Can I Get Loose", which appeared on The Dangerous Crew's Don't Try This at Home. In 1998, the now 12-year-old rapper became the first to sign to Too Short's short-lived record label, $hort Records. He released his debut album, School Dayz, on September 29, 1998, which spawned the minor hit, "Bounce, Rock, Skate, Roll". The track peaked at #45 in the UK Singles Chart in April 1999.

After School Dayz, DC appeared on T.W.D.Y's Lead the Way in 2000, and Too Short's Chase the Cat in 2001, however he has not been heard of since.

Discography

Studio albums

Guest appearances

References

1986 births
Rappers from Oakland, California
Living people
21st-century American rappers
21st-century American male musicians